Nasrollah Sajjadi (born 1951) is an Iranian politician and sports administrator who served as Vice and Acting Minister of Sports. He was acting Minister of Youth Affairs and Sports from 19 October until 1 November 2016. He assumed office after the resignation of Mahmoud Goudarzi and holds it until approval of the new minister. He was secretary-general of National Olympic Committee of the Islamic Republic of Iran and President of the Football Federation Islamic Republic of Iran in the 1980s and 1990s. He was also a member of the financial committee of Olympic Council of Asia and deputy Head of Physical Education Organization.

References

External links

People from Tehran
1951 births
Living people
Iranian Vice Ministers
Government ministers of Iran
Presidents of Iranian Football Federation
Iranian sportsperson-politicians
Iranian sports executives and administrators